Calliteara strigata is a moth of the family Erebidae first described by Frederic Moore in 1879.

Distribution
It is found in India, Thailand,  Malaysia Sundaland, Brunei, China and Vietnam.

References

Lymantriinae
Moths described in 1879
Moths of Asia